In mathematics, a critical pair may refer to:
Critical pair (term rewriting), terms resulting from two overlapping rules in a term rewriting system
Critical pair (order theory), two incomparable elements of a partial order that could be made comparable without changing any other relation in the partial order
The pair of polynomials associated with an S-polynomial in Buchberger's algorithm for computing a Gröbner basis